Two types of musical bow are common in Latvia:  the spēles and the pūšļa vijole. The spēles is simply a primitive musical bow that can be plucked, or bowed with a second bow. While the pūšļa vijole adds an inflated animal bladder as a resonator.

See also 
Bladder fiddle

References

Musical bows
Latvian musical instruments